The 2005–06 Vyshcha Liha season was the fifteenth since its establishment.

Summary
The season started on July 12, 2005 with six games of the first round. The last day of the competition was May 10, 2006. However, because the top two teams have finished with an equal number of points, it was decided to conduct a decisive game between them, which was named as the Golden Match. The game took place soon upon the conclusion of the regular season on May 14. The winner of the championship final became Shakhtar Donetsk that managed to defeat Dynamo Kyiv 2–1 and for the first time winning its second consecutive title and third over all. The top scorers competition was also tied between two foreigners Brandão from Brazil and Emmanuel Okoduwa from Nigeria. Both players won their individual award scoring 15 goals.

Both Shakhtar and Dynamo lost only once Shakhtar at home to Dynamo, while Dynamo lost its only game at home to Dnipro. Both Shakhtar and Dynamo also finished 30 points away from the closest trailing team in the standings. A good season had FC Illichivets Mariupol tying for the fourth together with FC Metalist Kharkiv and FC Dnipro Dnipropetrovsk. Also could be left unnoticed the big return of the Odessa sailors that finally earn their next set of medals for the first time since returning to premiers. Out of the newly promoted teams a good performance showed FC Stal Alchevsk that were just a point shy to stay among the top 10.

Both clubs from the Western Ukraine, FC Volyn Lutsk and FC Zakarpattia Uzhhorod, were forced into relegation due to their poor performance.

Teams

Promoted
FC Stal Alchevsk, champion of the 2004-05 Ukrainian First League – (returning after absence of 4 seasons)
FC Arsenal Kharkiv, runner-up of the 2004-05 Ukrainian First League was replaced with the newly formed FC Kharkiv – (debut)

Notes: FC Arsenal Kharkiv was reinstated in the Ukrainian Second League.

Renamed
FC Vorskla Poltava before the season carried the name of FC Vorskla-Naftogaz Poltava

Location map

Managers

League table

Results

Final match

Top goal scorers

See also
 2005–06 Ukrainian Cup

References

External links
ukrsoccerhistory.com - source of information
ukranianfootball.narod.ru

Ukrainian Premier League seasons
1
Ukra